Ali Dinçer (1945 – 18 April 2007) was a Turkish mechanical  engineer, politician, former Mayor of Ankara and former government minister.

Ali Dinçer was born in Razgrad, Bulgaria to a family of Turkish ancestry in 1945. While he was four years old, his family moved to Turkey. After completing Yıldırım Bayezıd High School and the Mechanical Engineering School of the Middle East Technical University, he obtained a Master's degree in Industrial Engineering. During his professional career, he was elected as the speaker of the Union of Chambers of Turkish Engineers and Architects.

Ali Dinçer married to Yıldız İbrahimova, a Bulgarian singer of Turkish ancestry.

Political career
In the university, he was a member of the Social Democracy Association. He joined the Republican People's Party (CHP), and in the local elections held on 11 December 1977, he was elected as the Mayor of Ankara. His term was cut short by the 1980 Turkish coup d'état. In 1995, he returned to politics. On 24 December 1995, he was elected into the 20th Parliament of Turkey as a deputy of Ankara. In the short-lived 52nd government of Turkey, he was appointed Minister of State serving between 30 October 1995 and 6 March 1996.  The CHP failed to enter the parliament in the next general election held on 18 April 1999. In the general election held on 3 November 2002, he was elected as a deputy of  Bursa into the 22nd Parliament.

Ali Dinçer died in Ankara on 18 April 2007 due to liver cancer.

Legacy

A  covering urban park in Yenimahalle secondary municipality of Ankara, which was opened to public on 29 September 2007, is named after Ali Dinçer.

References

1945 births
2007 deaths
People from Razgrad
Bulgarian Turks in Turkey
Middle East Technical University alumni
Turkish mechanical engineers
Turkish industrial engineers
Republican People's Party (Turkey) politicians
Mayors of Ankara
Deputies of Ankara
Members of the 20th Parliament of Turkey
Members of the 52nd government of Turkey
Ministers of State of Turkey
Deputies of Bursa
Members of the 22nd Parliament of Turkey
Deaths from cancer in Turkey
Deaths from liver cancer
Deputy Speakers of the Grand National Assembly of Turkey
20th-century Turkish engineers